The Mediterranean Region (Turkish: Akdeniz Bölgesi) (TR6) is a statistical region in Turkey.

Subregions and provinces 

 Antalya Subregion (TR61)
 Antalya Province (TR611)
 Isparta Province (TR612)
 Burdur Province (TR613)
 Adana Subregion (TR62)
 Adana Province (TR621)
 Mersin Province (TR622)
 Hatay Subregion (TR63)
 Hatay Province (TR631)
 Kahramanmaraş Province (TR632)
 Osmaniye Province (TR633)

Age groups

Internal immigration

State register location of Mediterranean residents

Marital status of 15+ population by gender

Education status of 15+ population by gender

See also 

 NUTS of Turkey

References

External links 
 TURKSTAT

Sources 
 ESPON Database

Statistical regions of Turkey